For the measurement of an alternating current the signal is often converted into a direct current of equivalent value, the root mean square (RMS). Simple instrumentation and signal converters carry out this conversion by filtering the signal into an average rectified value and applying a correction factor. The value of the correction factor applied is only correct if the input signal is sinusoidal.

True RMS provides a more correct value that is proportional to the square root of the average of the square of the curve, and not to the average of the absolute value. For any given waveform, the ratio of these two averages is constant and, as most measurements are made on what are (nominally) sine waves, the correction factor assumes this waveform; but any distortion or offsets will lead to errors. To achieve this, a true RMS converter requires a more complex circuit.

Digital RMS converters
If a waveform has been digitized, the correct RMS value may be calculated directly. Most digital and PC-based oscilloscopes include a function to give the RMS value of a waveform. The precision and the bandwidth of the conversion is entirely dependent on the analog to digital conversion. In most cases, true RMS measurements are made on repetitive waveforms, and under such conditions digital oscilloscopes (and a few sophisticated sampling multimeters) are able to achieve very high bandwidths as they sample at much higher sampling frequency than the signal frequency to obtain a stroboscopic effect.

Thermal converters
The RMS value of an alternating current is also known as its heating value, as it is a voltage which is equivalent to the direct current value that would be required to get the same heating effect. For example, if 120 V AC RMS is applied to a resistive heating element it would heat up by exactly the same amount as if 120 V DC were applied.

This principle was exploited in early thermal converters. The AC signal would be applied to a small heating element that was matched with a thermistor, which could be used in a DC measuring circuit.

The technique is not very precise but it will measure any waveform at any frequency (except for extremely low frequencies, where the thermistor's thermal capacitance is too small so that its temperature is fluctuating too much). A big drawback is that it is low-impedance: that is, the power used to heat the thermistor comes from the circuit being measured. If the circuit being measured can support the heating current, then it is possible to make a post-measurement calculation to correct the effect, as the impedance of the heating element is known. If the signal is small then a pre-amplifier is necessary, and the measuring capabilities of the instrument will be limited by this pre-amplifier.  In radio frequency (RF) work, the low impedance is not necessarily a drawback since 50 ohm driving and terminating impedances are widely used.

Thermal converters have become rare, but are still used by radio hams and hobbyists, who may remove the thermal element of an old unreliable instrument and incorporate it into a modern design of their own construction.  Additionally, at very high frequencies (microwave), RF power meters still use thermal techniques to convert the RF energy to a voltage.  Thermal-based power meters are the norm for millimeter wave (MMW) RF work.

Analog electronic converters
Analog electronic circuits may use:
 an analog multiplier in a specific configuration which multiplies the input signal by itself (squares it), averages the result with a capacitor, and then calculates the square root of the value (via a multiplier/squarer circuit in the feedback loop of an operational amplifier), or
 a full-wave precision rectifier circuit to create the absolute value of the input signal, which is fed into a log amplifier, doubled and fed into an exponential amplifier as a means of deriving the square-law transfer function , and then the time-average and square root are performed, similarly to above, 
 a log-domain precision detector (Blackmer RMS detector) also computes logarithm of absolute value of the input signal, however, time-averaging is performed on the logarithm, rather than square, of input. Output is logarithmic (decibel scale), with a fast attack but slow and linear decay.
 a field-effect transistor may be used to directly create the square-law transfer function, before time-averaging.

Unlike thermal converters they are subject to bandwidth limitations which makes them unsuitable for most RF work. The circuitry before time averaging is particularly crucial for high-frequency performance. The slew rate limitation of the operational amplifier used to create the absolute value (especially at low input signal levels) tends to make the second method the poorest at high frequencies, while the FET method can work close to VHF. Specialist techniques are required to produce sufficiently accurate integrated circuits for complex analog calculations, and very often meters equipped with such circuits offer true RMS conversion as an optional extra with a significant price increase.

References

External links 
 Circuit description of an analog true RMS-to-DC converter based on the log/antilog techniques.

 https://meterreviews.com/best-fluke-multimeter/    A list of digital multimeters having true rms feature in them.

Literature 
 Kurt Bergmann: Elektrische Messtechnik. Vieweg, 2000, 6. Aufl., S. 18.
 Wilfried Weißgerber: Elektrotechnik für Ingenieure 2. Springer Vieweg, 2013, 8. Aufl., S. 2.

Electronic circuits
Measuring instruments
Electronic amplifiers